John Henry Hannah Jr. (June 30, 1939 – December 4, 2003) from was an American lawyer, politician, and jurist who served as a United States district judge of the United States District Court for the Eastern District of Texas.

Early life and education

Born in Nacogdoches County, Hannah was raised in Diboll, Texas. He received a Bachelor of Science degree from Sam Houston State University in 1966 and attended the University of Houston Law Center and the South Texas College of Law. He did not receive a law degree from either institution and received his law license through self-study.

Career 
Hannah served in the United States Navy from 1958 to 1961. He served as a member of the Texas House of Representatives for the fifth district from 1967 to 1973 and worked in private practice in Lufkin from 1971 to 1973. He was a district attorney in Angelina County from 1973 to 1975 and was legal counsel to Common Cause of Texas in 1975, returning to private practice in Lufkin from 1975 to 1977. He was the United States Attorney for the Eastern District of Texas from 1977 to 1981 and again worked in private practice in Lufkin from 1981 to 1991. He was a secretary of state of Texas from 1991 to 1994. He was a member of the Democratic Party.

Federal judicial service 
On November 19, 1993, Hannah was nominated by President Bill Clinton to a new seat on the United States District Court for the Eastern District of Texas created by 104 Stat. 5089. He was confirmed by the United States Senate on March 10, 1994, and received his commission on March 11, 1994. He served as chief judge from 2001 to 2003.

Personal life

Hannah died suddenly of a heart attack on December 4, 2003, while attending a judicial conference in West Palm Beach, Florida. His wife, United States Magistrate Judith Guthrie was with him when he died.

References

Sources

1939 births
2003 deaths
Judges of the United States District Court for the Eastern District of Texas
People from Nacogdoches County, Texas
Military personnel from Texas
Democratic Party members of the Texas House of Representatives
Sam Houston State University alumni
South Texas College of Law alumni
United States Attorneys for the Eastern District of Texas
United States district court judges appointed by Bill Clinton
United States Navy sailors
People from Angelina County, Texas
20th-century American judges
21st-century American judges